Solomon Henry Jackson (died 13 Feb 1847, New York City) was a pioneer American Jewish printer.

Biography 
An immigrant from England, Jackson settled in Pike County, Pennsylvania, and married the daughter (Helen Annie Miller) of a local Presbyterian minister.

In the 1820s, Jackson moved to New York City. Thereafter, he established the city's first Hebrew printing press.

Jackson published the first Jewish periodical in the United States. It was an anti-missionary journal entitled The Jew: being a defence of Judaism against all adversaries, and particularly against the insidious attacks of "Israel's Advocate". ("Israel's Advocate; or, the Restoration of the Jews contemplated and urged", a publication of the American Society for Meliorating the Condition of the Jews, was a missionary publication endeavoring to convert Jews to Christianity.) He also published the first Hebrew prayer book in the United States, and the first Haggadah in the United States.

References
Goldman, Yosef. Hebrew Printing in America, 1735-1926, A History and Annotated Bibliography (YGBooks 2006). .

External links
 S.H. Jackson, ed. The Jew; being a defence of Judaism against all adversaries, and the attacks of Israel's Advovate. 1824

Jewish printing and publishing
1840s deaths
Year of birth missing
English emigrants to the United States
American people of English-Jewish descent
Jewish American writers